Edyta Śliwińska (born May 6, 1981) is a Polish professional ballroom dancer who is starring in the stage show Dance Temptation. She is best known for her appearances on the American version of the reality television series Dancing with the Stars, where she appeared on all of the first ten seasons of the show.

Early life 
Śliwińska was born in Warsaw, Poland, and comes from a working-class Polish background. She took her first dancing class at age 12.

Dancing with the Stars 
In the debut season of Dancing with the Stars in June 2005, Śliwińska partnered boxing champion Evander Holyfield, with whom she placed 5th in the competition.

For the second season, she was paired with actor George Hamilton, and again came in 5th place.

With the third season, her partner was actor Joey Lawrence, and the couple achieved 3rd place. Śliwińska and Lawrence were part of the first performance tour of the show from December 19, 2006 to February 11, 2007.

For Season 4, she originally had Vincent Pastore as her partner, but Pastore dropped out after a week of training, as he was unable to keep up with the hard pace of preparation. On March 2, John Ratzenberger was announced to be Pastore's replacement, giving Ratzenberger the least time of any celebrity to prepare for the series at the time. On May 1, 2007, Sliwinska and Ratzenberger became the sixth couple eliminated from the competition, with a finish of 6th place.

In Season 5, Śliwińska was partnered with soap opera actor Cameron Mathison. They became the eighth couple eliminated before the Semi-Finals, with a finish of 5th place for the third time.

In Season 6 her partner was NFL player Jason Taylor. They won second place, giving Śliwińska her best finish to date.

In Season 7, Śliwińska and her partner American Comedian and Roastmaster Jeffrey Ross were the first couple voted off. They did not get their chance to show their Quickstep. During practice, Ross suffered an eye injury. Misty May-Treanor had suffered a leg injury in week three of the competition, and since she wanted to show America her Jive, Śliwińska danced it for her on the next night's result show. After week six, Śliwińska temporarily replaced Julianne Hough as Cody Linley's professional partner until Hough recovered from surgery scheduled on October 28, 2008.

In Season 8, Śliwińska was paired with NFL player Lawrence Taylor. They were eliminated in the seventh week of the show on April 21, 2009 with the lowest judged score of 21 and came in 7th place.

For Season 9, Śliwińska was paired with Ashley Hamilton, George Hamilton's son. They were eliminated first making Sliwinska the third professional to come in last more than once along with Alec Mazo (her husband), Jonathan Roberts, and Tristan MacManus.

For Season 10, it was announced on March 2, 2010 that she would be partnered up with soap opera star Aiden Turner. They were voted off in the fourth week of the competition and came in 9th place.

On March 2, 2016 it was announced that Śliwińska would return for season 22 after an eleven-season hiatus and is partnered with journalist Geraldo Rivera. The couple was the first to be eliminated on Week 2 of competition.

Dancing with the Stars performances

With Evander Holyfield

With George Hamilton

With Joey Lawrence

With John Ratzenberger

With Cameron Mathison

With Jason Taylor

With Jeffrey Ross

With Lawrence Taylor

With Ashley Hamilton

With Aiden Turner

With Geraldo Rivera

Personal life
Śliwińska's husband and professional partner in dance competitions is Alec Mazo, who also participated in Dancing with the Stars, winning with Kelly Monaco. They have danced together for over 6 years and have performed together multiple times for Dancing with the Stars results shows in pair numbers.   They married on September 1, 2007. The couple welcomed their son, Michael Alexander Mazo, on January 4, 2014. On June 18, 2017 she gave birth to their second child, a daughter Leia Josephine.

Professional awards
 Emerald Ball Latin Amateur Champion
 1st Place - 2001 International Grand Ball (San Francisco)
 1st Place - 2001 Holiday Ball (Las Vegas, Nevada)

Acting career
 Śliwińska appeared in a Jared's jewelry commercial along with fellow Dancing With the Stars pros Maksim Chmerkovskiy, Alec Mazo,  and Shalene Archer Ermis.
 She played Ruby Love on CSI:NY on the 13th episode of season 5 called "Rush to Judgment", where she played a salsa dance teacher who was involved in a murder.
 In 2013, Śliwińska appeared on the May 13th edition of WWE Raw as the dance partner of Dancing with the Stars alumni Chris Jericho during a Dance-Off segment between Jericho and herself against Fandango and his partner Summer Rae.

References

External links 

 Edyta Śliwińska - Official Twitter Profile
 Edyta Śliwińska - Official website
 Edyta Sliwinska - Official Myspace Profile
 Edyta Śliwińska - Official Dance and Fitness DVD
 
 DancePlaza.com entry for Alex Mazo and Edyta

Polish ballroom dancers
Living people
Entertainers from Warsaw
1981 births
Place of birth missing (living people)
Participants in American reality television series